The Brown University School of Engineering is the engineering school of Brown University, a private Ivy League research university located in Providence, Rhode Island. Brown's engineering program is the third oldest civilian engineering program in the United States and the oldest undergraduate program in the Ivy League. The School of Engineering is noted for its historically prominent contributions to continuum and applied mechanics, originally led by European émigré researchers in the 20th century. Brown's Division of Engineering was elevated in 2010 to its current status as a school.

The Brown University School of Engineering awards undergraduate, graduate, and doctoral degrees. The school additionally offers a 5th-year master program as well as a joint graduate program with the Rhode Island School of Design. Although undergraduate students may officially declare their concentration in engineering as late as the end of their sophomore year, students with an intention in concentration in engineering typically must begin the engineering curriculum their first semester at Brown.

History
Brown offered its first engineering course in 1847, making the school's program the oldest undergraduate engineering program in the Ivy League and the third-oldest civilian engineering program in the United States. In 1850, the civil engineering curriculum was inaugurated as a focused one and a half year program. In 1903, engineering moved into its own new building on Lincoln Field.

The current program was formed in 1916 from the combination of civil, mechanical, and electrical engineering departments.

In 2010, the university elevated its Division of Engineering to its current status as the Brown University School of Engineering, making it the only undergraduate department at Brown with such status. In July 2011, Lawrence Larson became the school's inaugural Dean. Prior to his appointment, Larson served as the chair of the Electrical and Computer Engineering Department at the Jacobs School of Engineering at the University of California, San Diego.

Between 2014 and 2017, the school undertook a major expansion of its facilities, designing and constructing a new Engineering Research Center.

Undergraduate education
The Brown University School of Engineering offers ABET-accredited engineering concentrations in biomedical, chemical, computer, electrical, environmental engineering, materials, and mechanical engineering (Sc.B.). Also offered is a program in engineering-physics. In addition, the Brown School of Engineering offer a bachelor of arts degree in engineering.

Master's and Ph.D. programs
The Brown University School of Engineering offers Sc.M. programs in biomedical engineering, chemical engineering, electrical sciences and computer engineering, fluids and thermal sciences, materials science, and mechanics of solids. An integrated five-year Sc.B./Sc.M. degree is also available. The Program in Innovation Management and Entrepreneurship (PRIME) is also a one-year master's degree in technology entrepreneurship.

The Brown University School of Engineering offers Ph.D. programs in biomedical engineering, chemical engineering, electrical sciences and computer engineering, fluids and thermal sciences, materials science, and mechanics of solids.

In 2020, the school partnered with the Rhode Island School of Design's Division of Architecture and Design to launch a new joint Master of Arts in Design Engineering (MADE) program. The program is designed as an 11-month residential program and began in the summer of 2021.

Rankings 
In its 2021 rankings, U.S. News & World Report ranked Brown as the 37th best undergraduate engineering school in the country. The School of Engineering graduate program ranked 51st.

In 2019, Brown awarded the 7th highest percentage of undergraduate engineering bachelor’s degrees to women, at 47%.

Notable alumni

Graduates of the School of Engineering have become prominent scientists, astronauts, athletes, government officials, pioneers, entrepreneurs, CEOs, financiers, and scholars.

Among the school's notable graduates in business are Dara Khosrowshahi '91, CEO of Uber and former CEO of Expedia; Aneel Bhusri '88, co-founder and co-CEO of Workday; Melanie Whelan '99, former CEO of SoulCycle; John S. Chen '78, president and CEO of Sybase and interim CEO of Blackberry; George M.C. Fisher Sc.M. '64 Ph.D. '66, CEO of Motorola; Theresia Gouw '90, Forbes Midas List investor; and Mary Lou Jepsen '87 Ph.D. '97.

Notable alumni in academia and research include Sangeeta N. Bhatia '90, John J. and Dorothy Wilson Professor at MIT and HHMI Investigator; Ayanna Howard '93, dean of the Ohio State University College of Engineering; Ka Yee Christina Lee (1985), Provost at the University of Chicago; and Yang Wei Ph.D. '85, president emeritus of Zhejiang University. Other graduates in academia include Tejal A. Desai '94, Dean of Engineering at Brown University; Kaliat Ramesh '85 Ph.D. '88, Alonzo G. Decker Jr. Professor of Science and Engineering at Johns Hopkins University; Lallit Anand Ph.D. 1975, Warren and Towneley Rohsenow Professor of Mechanical Engineering at MIT; and Reda R. Mankbadi Ph.D. '79, Founding Dean of the Embry-Riddle College of Engineering. 

The school's alumni in aeronautics and space research and travel include Thomas O. Paine '42, third administrator of NASA (1969–1970); Byron K. Lichtenberg '69 fighter pilot and payload specialist; and Brian Binnie '75 Sc.M. '76, former United States Navy officer and test pilot for SpaceShipOne.

Notable athletes to have graduated from the school include racecar driver Mark Donohue '59; football players Steve Jordan '82 and James Develin '10; and olympic rowers Dick Dreissigacker '69, Jamie Koven '95, Igor Boraska '95, and Nikola Stojić '97.

References

Notes 

Engineering schools and colleges in the United States
Engineering universities and colleges in Rhode Island
Brown University